This is a list of electoral results for the Electoral district of Guildford in Western Australian state elections.

Members for Guildford

Election results

Elections in the 1950s

 Two party preferred vote was estimated.

Elections in the 1940s

 Collins and Davies recorded the same number of first-preference votes, but Collins' preferences were distributed first.

 Preferences were not distributed.

Elections in the 1930s

Elections in the 1920s

Elections in the 1910s

 Preferences were not distributed.

Elections in the 1900s

References

Western Australian state electoral results by district